Milan Lazarević (born July 11, 1948 in Belgrade) is a Yugoslav handball player who competed in the 1972 Summer Olympics.

He was part of the Yugoslav team which won the gold medal at the Munich Games. He played all six matches and scored 27 goals.

External links
 profile

1948 births
Living people
Handball players from Belgrade
Yugoslav male handball players
Serbian male handball players
Olympic handball players of Yugoslavia
Handball players at the 1972 Summer Olympics
Olympic gold medalists for Yugoslavia
Olympic medalists in handball
Medalists at the 1972 Summer Olympics
RK Crvena zvezda players